Anime Himitsu no Hanazono is an anime television series aired in Japan from 1991 to 1992. It is an adaptation of the 1911 novel The Secret Garden by Frances Hodgson Burnett.

Cast
Major:
Ben Weatherstaff (Japanese: Yoichi Miyakawa)
Colin Craven (Japanese: Minami Takayama)
Craven ("Clevin") (Japanese: Osamu Saka) possibly Archibald Craven (Colin's father) or Dr. Craven (Archibald's brother)
Dickon Sowerby (Japanese: Mayumi Tanaka)
Helen McCoy (Japanese: Masako Katsuki)
Mary Lennox (Japanese: Miina Tominaga)
Martha Phoebe Sowerby (Japanese: Chika Sakamoto)
Mr. Pitcher (Japanese: Fumihiko Tachiki)
Narrator (Japanese: Tomoko Munakata)
Sarah Ann Medlock (Japanese: Toshiko Ota or Yoshiko Oota)
Susan Ann Sowerby (Japanese: Kazuyo Aoki)

Other:
Bunny (Japanese: Yoshiko Kamei)
Camilla (Japanese: Fumi Hirano)
Hawkins (Japanese: Akio Ohtsuka)
Henry (Japanese: Rokuro Naya)
Jim (Japanese: Urara Takano)
Natalie (Japanese: Midori Nakasawa)
Patty (Japanese: Minami Takayama)
Sam (Japanese: Masamichi Sato)

Music
Yoshie Hayasaka sings both:
 opening 逆転タイフーン (Gyakuten Typhoon)
 ending はらほろひれはれ (Harahorohirehare)

Titles in other languages
  ("The Secret Garden"; first dub),  ("Raneem and the Garden"; second dub)
  (Taiwan),  (Hong Kong, Macau, Guangdong and Guangxi)
  ("Mary and The Mysterious Garden")
  ("The Secret Garden")
  ("The Secret Garden")
  ("The Magic Garden") (Italian-dubbed version with Portuguese subtitles)
  ("The Secret Garden") (Mexico, Chile and Spain only; the latter country has a dubbed version that was based on the Italian version)
  ("Mary and The Secret Garden")
  ("The hidden garden")

References

External links
 
 

1991 anime television series debuts
Films based on The Secret Garden
Animated television series about orphans
NHK original programming
Television shows set in England
Historical anime and manga